Thomas Zebrowski (November 24, 1714 in Samogitia – March 18, 1758 in Vilnius) was a Jesuit architect, mathematician, and astronomer. He was instrumental in establishing and funding the Observatory of Vilnius University. Marcin Odlanicki Poczobutt was among his students.

Biography
Zebrowski studied philosophy and theology at Vilnius University. He briefly taught at Jesuit schools in Kražiai, Ilūkste, and Babruysk and prepared construction projects for churches in these towns. They displayed features of Baroque churches in Vilnius.

After studying at Charles University in Prague under Joseph Stepling in 1750–52, Zebrowski returned to Vilnius, becoming a popular lecturer of physics and astronomy at Vilnius University. He was also interested in geodesy, horology, mineralogy, geography. However, his major passion was astronomy and he pursued funding for an observatory. The construction was funded by Elżbieta Ogińska-Puzynina, while Mikolaj Radziwill and bishop Józef Sapieha donated   and  diameter reflector telescopes manufactured in Germany. Zebrowski designed the observatory; its construction began in 1753.

References

1714 births
1758 deaths
17th-century Lithuanian Jesuits
18th-century Polish–Lithuanian astronomers
Architects from Vilnius
Charles University alumni
Vilnius University alumni
Academic staff of Vilnius University
18th-century Polish–Lithuanian mathematicians
Jesuit scientists